The 1981 Australian Grand Prix was a Formula Pacific motor race held at Calder Park Raceway in Victoria, Australia on 8 November 1981.

It was the forty sixth Australian Grand Prix and the first to be restricted to Formula Pacific racing cars. It was the first AGP since 1968 to feature two or more current or past World Drivers' Champions with reigning 1981 World Champion Nelson Piquet of Brazil and Australia's 1980 World Champion Alan Jones both in the field.

The race was won by 22-year-old Roberto Moreno by over a lap from Nelson Piquet with Australian Geoff Brabham finishing third. The top three drivers all drove Ralt RT4's (13 of the 20 starters were in fact driving the 1.6L Ford powered RT4's). To actually be able to compete in the Grand Prix Moreno needed five endorsements before the race to be able to obtain his FIA Super Licence, the first endorsement coming from Calder Park Clerk of Course Ken Smith.

Defending race winner Alan Jones failed to finish after transmission failure in his RT4 six laps from the finish while in second place. The first resident Australian driver home was another ex-Formula One driver and future touring car star Larry Perkins who finished fourth, one lap behind Moreno.

Classification 

Results as follows:

Qualifying

Race

Notes 
Pole position: Roberto Moreno – 0'39.2
Fastest lap: Roberto Moreno – 0'39.8 (145.6 km/h, 90.5 mph)
 Winner's average speed: 142.8 km/h, 88.7 mph

References

External links
 autopics.com.au

Grand Prix
Australian Grand Prix
Australian Grand Prix